Imran Sardhariya (born 28 December 1979) is an Indian choreographer and film director known for his works in the South Indian film industry, and a few Bollywood films. He is the son of Late Haji Ayub.

Career
Sardhariya is a well known choreographer in South Indian movies. His Life in the Industry for the past ten years has a credit of success more than 250 songs and briefly 100 movies. In addition, he has worked on two Telugu Movies Josh and Chalaaki. He was trained for five years by Mr. Jai Borade who is a winner of the national film award for best choreography in Hum Aapke Hain Koun. He has a Dance School in Bangalore known as Dinky’s Dance and Music Academy (DDMA).

Imran Sardhariya made his directorial debut with Endendigu in 2015 starring Ajay Rao and Radhika Pandit in lead roles, which is produced by S V Babu of SV Productions, Edited by Deepu S Kumar, Music by V Harikrishna and Camera by Venkatesh Anguraj.
He had been one of the judges of Dance Karnataka Dance(Reality Show) which was telecasted on Zee Kannada in 2017.

Awards
He has won several awards for choreography.

In addition to his credentials he has garnered awards from ETV, ZTV Kannada, Kasturi Kannada channels for Best choreography

Filmography

Director

Choreographer

References

External links
 

1979 births
Indian choreographers
Kannada film directors
Artists from Bangalore
Living people
Dancers from Karnataka
Film people from Karnataka